Sunflower (Helianthus) is a genus of annual flowering plants native to North America.

Sunflower or Sunflowers may also refer to:

Art, entertainment, and media

Film
 Sunflower (1970 film), an Italian film
 Sunflower (2005 film), a Chinese film
 Sunflower (2006 film), a South Korean film

Music
 Sunflower (The Beach Boys album), 1970
 Sunflower (Milt Jackson album), 1972
 Sunflower (Never Shout Never album), 2013
 Sunflower (single album), by Choi Yoo-jung, 2022
 "Sunflower" (Glen Campbell song), 1977
 "Sunflower" (Paul Weller song), 1993
 "Sunflower" (Post Malone and Swae Lee song), 2018
 "Sunflower" (Vampire Weekend song), 2019
 Sunflower Records, a record label
 Sunflowers (band), a Sri Lankan band
 Henry Vestine, an American guitarist known as "The Sunflower"
 "Sunflower", a song by Raffi on his 1995 album Raffi Radio
 "Sunflower", a song by Rex Orange County
 "Sunflowers", a song by Everclear on the album So Much for the Afterglow

Fine art
 Sunflowers (Van Gogh series), a series of 1880s paintings by Vincent van Gogh
 Sunflowers, a 1972 screen print by Ivor Abrahams

Literature
 The Sunflower: On the Possibilities and Limits of Forgiveness, a book by Simon Wiesenthal

Fictional characters
 Sunflower, a character from the video game Plants vs. Zombies
 Sunflower, a deleted character from the 1940 Disney film Fantasia
 Kasumi Seizō, or the "samurai who smells of sunflowers", a character from the Samurai Champloo manga and anime series

Television
"Sunflower", Foyle's War Series Seven, episode 3

Businesses
 Sunflower Corporation, an American daylighting company based in Boulder, Colorado
 Sunflower Farmers Market, an American grocery store chain
 Sunflowers Interactive Entertainment Software, a game developer

Places
United States
 Sunflower, Mississippi
 Sunflower County, Mississippi
 Sunflower, West Virginia
 Sunflower, Wisconsin
 Sunflower Army Ammunition Plant, in Johnson County, Kansas
 Kansas is nicknamed "The Sunflower State".

Plants and products
 Helianthus, a genus of plants known as sunflowers
  Helianthus annuus,  the common sunflower
 Sunflower seed
 Sunflower oil, an ingredient in food and cosmetics

Other uses
 Sunflower (cocktail), a cocktail made with gin
 Sunflower (mathematics), a system of sets
 Operation Sunflower, the deployment of German troops to North Africa in 1941, during World War II 
 Operation Sunflower, also the name of a German attempt to hold back the advancing Allied Forces in the Battle of Normandy, 1944
 Sunflower, a signal used in the British rail Automatic Warning System
 Sunflower Student Movement, a series of protests that took place in Taiwan in 2014
 Hidden Disabilities Sunflower, a British scheme to help disabled people find assistance